This is a list of diplomatic missions of Kenya, excluding honorary consulates.

Current missions

Africa

Americas

Asia

Europe

Oceania

Multilateral organizations

Gallery

Closed missions

Africa

See also
 Foreign relations of Kenya
 List of diplomatic missions in Kenya
 Visa policy of Kenya

Notes

References

 Kenyan Ministry of Foreign Affairs

 
Diplomatic missions
Kenya